Teela  is a fictional superheroine from the Masters of the Universe franchise. She is the Captain of the Royal Guard at the palace of Eternos and thus responsible for training and protecting Prince Adam of Eternia. While Adam is He-Man, Teela often assists him in his battles, but she is unaware of his alternate identity. Teela is one of the first characters developed for Masters of the Universe, although her figure was released in the second half of the first wave. Writer Donald F. Glut named her after Gunga Ram's elephant from the 
Andy's Gang television show.

Origin
She is the daughter of Man at Arms and the Sorceress of Power.

Appearances in media

In comics

Minicomic series
Teela is presented in the earliest media as a heroic "warrior goddess," a capable female fighter—one imbued with the spirits of great warriors of the past—who roams the deserted landscapes of Eternia atop a unicorn. In a fashion typical of 1980s cartoons, she was portrayed in a leotard. The second-wave minicomic The Tale of Teela explains that, twenty years earlier, Skeletor captured the Goddess (a.k.a. Sorceress, also named "Teela") and made a clone of her using an ancient artifact. His plan was to raise the child as an evil version of the Goddess. However, the clone was rescued by Man-At-Arms and grew up to become the warrior Teela. After the second wave of mini-comics, the concept of Teela being a clone was abandoned, with her instead becoming an abandoned child who was adopted by Man-At-Arms, highlighted in the 1983 animated Filmation series. Only in the Masters of the Universe Classics toyline that launched in 2008, were elements of the clone storyline concept reintroduced, albeit on a much reduced basis.

He-Man and the Masters of the Universe (2012)

In the new incarnation Teela assumes the mantle of the Sorceress of Castle Grayskull from her mother.

In television

He-Man and the Masters of the Universe (1983 series)
In the Filmation animated series He-Man and the Masters of the Universe, Teela is the biological daughter of the Sorceress. Man-At-Arms discovers that the Sorceress, in the form of the falcon Zoar, has been caring for the infant Teela in a large bird's nest on the side of a cliff. After a failed kidnap attempt by Mer-Man, the Sorceress willingly gives Teela to Man-At-Arms to be raised as his own daughter. In Teela's Quest, Teela discovers the truth about her mother from Eternia's Oracle of the Crystal Sea, but an emotionally distraught Sorceress erases the revelation from Teela's memory for her own protection, even though the Sorceress desperately wishes she could tell Teela the truth.

Teela's Quest also specifies that Mer-Man's attempt at abducting the infant Teela took place exactly 20 years earlier; thus, it implies that she is just over 20 years old.  In the second-season episode, The Great Books Mystery, Adam celebrates his 19th birthday, so they are approximately the same age.

Teela's biological father is never revealed; Man-At-Arms says he was one of Eternia's greatest men. However, the Oracle, the Sorceress, and Man-At-Arms all agree that he died in battle. Teela's ties to Grayskull are revisited in the episode Teela's Triumph when Skeletor sends the Sorceress to another dimension, leaving Teela to take the Sorceress' place as guardian of Grayskull until she returns.

Despite her excellent fighting skills and generally being sensible and level-headed, Teela has a reckless streak like that of a wild tomboy, a far cry from her mother's soft-spoken temperament. In the Filmation series, Teela's recklessness and quick temper in situations that she does not agree with often lead to poor judgment, which results in dangerous situations. Unaware of Adam's dual-identity and duties that go with it, Teela often reprimands him for being lazy, cowardly and inattentive to his training, though the second-season episode The Problem with Power suggests a clear romantic tension with He-Man.

The New Adventures of He-Man (1990)

In the series The New Adventures of He-Man, which ran from 1990-1991, Teela makes one appearance in the episode Once Upon a Time, a rare reference to the vintage Filmation series. However, she bears no resemblance to her Filmation counterpart, being portrayed with long blond hair instead of red hair. This was how she was featured in the very first mini-comic, though some fans have theorized she was redesigned to resemble He-Man's sister, She-Ra. She wears a pink leotard, rather than the usual white one. She is voiced by Cathy Weseluck.

Masters of the Universe vs. The Snake Men (2002 series)

The basic outline of her character remains the same in the 2002 series, but is taken to a greater extreme due to a difference in censors and restrictions.  She still teases or reprimands Adam for his apparent lack of courage and gumption while harboring an unspoken and unconsummated crush on his alter-ego, He-Man, and is still a very durable fighter in her own right. However, Teela appears to be much younger and leaner in the 2002 series than she is in the 1980s series. She also wears her hair in a long ponytail, as opposed to the 1980s figure and cartoon character who is represented with her hair up. Although the Filmation version of Teela has a short temper, the new version of Teela is portrayed as brasher and slightly more aggressive.

In the episode Out of the Past, Teela says that she is 16 years old. She also briefly displays limited telepathic powers after a blood transfusion from her mother the Sorceress; the power fades as the Sorceress's blood fades away within Teela's blood. As with the previous versions of the story, Teela was adopted by Man-At-Arms, or rather was entrusted to him by her mother the Sorceress, because her birth father, an amnesiac Eternian soldier whom the Sorceress had nursed back to health, had disappeared, having presumably died in battle. There are hints in both the episode "Out of the Past" as well as the 3rd-season episode guide of the series DVD, that Man-At-Arms is actually her biological father as well. Another possibility could be Fisto as he was the person who was with the Sorceress at the time Teela's father went missing. It was intended that Teela would learn the truth of her heritage in the third season, but the series was canceled before it could be resolved. Despite her young age, Teela is the Captain of the Palace Guard as in the original series and seen in several episodes commanding the palace soldiers.

In the MOTU comic produced at the same time, a greater emphasis is placed on Teela and Adam's friendship. Teela admits in the original mini-series that she would rather play with him, as they did as children within the palace walls, than be a soldier trained to expect war. Adam reassures her that what she does will bring that day closer, holding her hand. In the regular comic series, she becomes jealous of the attention Adam lavishes on a weak, critically injured Evil-Lyn. This version of the character was voiced by Lisa Ann Beley.

In film

Masters of the Universe (1987)
In the 1987 film Masters of the Universe, she is portrayed by Solid Gold dancer-turned-actress Chelsea Field as a mostly-serious fighter who rarely allows her dark sense of humor to show through. Nothing is said of her being the daughter of the Sorceress (who is portrayed here by Christina Pickles of St. Elsewhere fame). Teela's costume in the film is quite different from its animated depictions. It is more of a gray colored jump suit. Field portrays Teela as having a curly brown mane rather than her usual red/auburn hair. The movie also hints that Teela is vegetarian, given her reaction in a scene where she and Man-At-Arms are eating barbecued ribs. This version of Teela also seems more adept at handling a laser gun over the staff-wielding, aerobic Teela seen in other incarnations.

Live Action He-Man reboot film
Teela will appear in the Netflix-produced rebooted live-action He-Man.

Masters of the Universe: Revelation
Teela is the lead character in the 2021 Netflix animated series Masters of the Universe: Revelation. The series reveals not only the secrets of Adam and Grayskull to Teela, but also leads her to discover and embrace her ultimate destiny as the Sorceress of Grayskull, and, unlike her mother, Teela is able to find a means of circumventing the connection to Grayskull so she may live a life outside the castle, with Adam still at her side as her champion and lover. Her true parentage is also revealed, with her adoptive father Duncan having been her real one all along.

In toys

Masters of the Universe Classics (2008-2015)

In their storyline for the latest Mattel toyline, which combines previous plot elements with newly written material, Teela is a clone of the current Sorceress Teela Na, and was raised by Man-At-Arms as his daughter. After becoming the new Sorceress, Teela would eventually marry King He-Man, and give birth to a son named Dare.

Reception

In mid-December 2010, Teela was voted by UGO.com 28th Our Favorite Ladies from Other Planets. In July 2016, Blastr ranked Teela No.12 in Every He-Man and the Masters of the Universe action figure, ranked. Game Rant rated Teela one of top 10 MOTU characters.

References

Fictional characters introduced in 1981
Masters of the Universe Heroic Warriors
Female characters in animated series
Fictional adoptees
Fictional women soldiers and warriors
Fictional characters who use magic
Fictional military captains
Fictional female captains
Female superheroes